Bilton may refer to:

Places in England
Bilton, Northumberland
Bilton, Warwickshire
Bilton, East Riding of Yorkshire
Bilton, Harrogate, North Yorkshire
Bilton-in-Ainsty, North Yorkshire
New Bilton, Warwickshire

Buildings 
 Bilton Grange, Warwickshire
 Bilton Hall (North Yorkshire), large country house near Harrogate, England
 Bilton Hall, Warwickshire, mansion house at Bilton, Warwickshire
 Bilton School, Warwickshire

People with the surname
Bilton (surname)

See also
Bilton Grange (disambiguation)